Brosseau, a French surname, could mean:

People
 Claire Elyse Brosseau (b. 1977), Canadian actress and comedian
 Christa Brosseau, Canadian chemist
 Ruth Ellen Brosseau (b. 1984), Canadian Member of Parliament
 Mike Brosseau, American baseball player
 Thomas Anderson "Tom" Brosseau, American singer-songwriter
 Gerald Brosseau Gardner (1884—1964), English civil servant, amateur anthropologist, writer, and occultist

Places
 Brosseau, a hamlet or village in Alberta, Canada
 Brosseau Station, a former village and former railway station in present-day Brossard, Quebec, Canada

Other
 Rochelle Brosseau v. Kenneth J. Haugen ~ 543 U.S. 194, 2004 U.S. Supreme Court decision

See also
 Brousseau

French-language surnames